The Bangladesh women's cricket team played three Women's One Day Internationals (WODIs) against the Zimbabwe women's cricket team in November 2021. The matches were played at the Queens Sports Club in Bulawayo, and were used by both teams for their preparation for the 2021 Women's Cricket World Cup Qualifier tournament, also in Zimbabwe.

Bangladesh won the opening match by eight wickets, after Zimbabwe were bowled out for only 48 runs. Bangladesh won the second match by nine wickets to win the series with one game to play. Bangladesh also won the third and final match, by the margin of seven wickets, to win the series 3–0.

Squads

Shamima Sultana and Suraiya Azmin were both named as reserve players in Bangladesh's squad. Zimbabwe's preparations were hindered by injuries to several players, including senior batter Chipo Mugeri-Tiripano who suffered a broken foot during T20 World Cup Africa Qualifier in September 2021, and was ruled out of this series.

WODI series

1st WODI

2nd WODI

3rd WODI

Notes

References

External links
 Series home at ESPN Cricinfo

Bangladesh 2021-22
Zimbabwe 2021-22
International cricket competitions in 2021–22
2021 in Bangladeshi cricket
2021 in Zimbabwean cricket
2021 in women's cricket